Samuel Duckworth (1786 – 3 December 1847) was a British barrister and politician.

Born in Manchester, Duckworth studied at Trinity College, Cambridge, then followed his father in becoming a solicitor and barrister, practising at the Chancery Bar.  At the 1837 UK general election, he stood in Leicester and won a seat as a Radical Whig.  In February 1839, he was appointed as Master in Chancery, and so left Parliament.

References

1786 births
1847 deaths
Alumni of Trinity College, Cambridge
English barristers
Lawyers from Manchester
Politicians from Manchester
UK MPs 1837–1841
Whig (British political party) MPs for English constituencies
Committee members of the Society for the Diffusion of Useful Knowledge